Emmanuel Luis D. Nimedez (April 3, 1999 – August 16, 2020), also known as Emman Nimedez or Emman, was a Filipino YouTuber, director, singer, actor, and filmmaker known for his short film, covers, and parody videos. He also appeared in showbiz in the ABS-CBN sitcom Luv U with Jairus Aquino and Michelle Vito.

Nimedez rose to popularity in 2017 for his parody videos of Korean dramas that went viral online. The last video he was able to produce was a lyric video of his song "Uuwian".

Career 
Emman Nimedez started making YouTube videos in 2011 but only rose to fame in 2017 for his parody of Korean dramas.

Discography

Singles

Filmography

Film

Television

Accolades

Death

 

Nimedez was diagnosed with acute myeloid leukemia on May 17, 2020, and underwent chemotherapy until August 12, 2020.

On August 13, 2020, Nimedez was rushed to the Intensive Care Unit at St. Luke's Medical Center – Quezon City due to kidney failure and blood complications and was in critical condition. After three days of battling a critical and unstable condition, on August 16, Nimedez died battling leukemia, at the age of 21. He was buried on August 22, 2020 at Himlayang Pilipino Cemetery, Pasong Tamo, Quezon City. His father, Louie Nimedez, and fellow YouTuber Cong TV gave their eulogies during his funeral.

Tribute
On October 11, 2020, Nimedez and fellow YouTuber Lloyd Cadena (who died on September 4) were honored by Raiza Contawi in the Philippine segment of YouTube FanFest 2020.

References

External links
 

1999 births
2020 deaths
21st-century Filipino male actors
Filipino YouTubers
People from Quezon City
Deaths from leukemia
YouTube channels launched in 2011
YouTube channels closed in 2021
Deaths from cancer in the Philippines